Sampantaea amentiflora is a plant species of the family Euphorbiaceae, first described as a genus in 1972. The genus Sampantaea is monotypic and found in Thailand and Cambodia.

References

Acalypheae
Monotypic Euphorbiaceae genera
Flora of Cambodia
Flora of Thailand